This is a list of Registered Historic Places in South Kingstown, Rhode Island.

|}

See also

National Register of Historic Places listings in Washington County, Rhode Island
List of National Historic Landmarks in Rhode Island

References

N
.
.South Kingstown
South Kingstown
South Kingstown, Rhode Island